David Oxton (born 22 December 1945) is a former New Zealand racing driver. Oxton spent the majority of his career racing open wheel cars in New Zealand and Australia but did drive touring cars late in his career.

Career
Oxton's career started in the late 1960s, driving a Daimler SP250 in New Zealand motorsport events and in 1968 he made the move to open-wheel racing. Oxton won two consecutive New Zealand Formula Ford Championships from 1970 to 1972 and in 1971 he debuted in both the New Zealand Gold Star Championship and the Tasman Series. During the 1970s Oxton would go on to win three New Zealand Gold Stars but did not achieve the same success in the Tasman Series, with a best finish of eighth in 1972 and 1974.

In 1973 Oxton travelled to the United Kingdom to compete in Formula Atlantic and Formula 5000 but he did not achieve great success on his overseas venture. He also competed in the BRDC International Trophy, a non-championship Formula One race, at Silverstone the same year, but failed to finish. Oxton competed in Formula Atlantic in Canada in 1977, a year in which he also began competing in the New Zealand International Formula Pacific Series. He finished tenth in the series in 1977 but would go on to win the title in the 1980–81 season and finish runner-up in 1983. Oxton won his fourth New Zealand Gold Star in the 1981–82 season.

The 1980s saw Oxton begin racing touring cars, starting with the Benson & Hedges Saloon Car Series in 1982, finishing 2nd at Pukekohe with star Australian driver Peter Brock in a HDT Special Vehicles Holden VC Commodore.

Oxton then partnered Brock in the Holden Dealer Team in Australia's first year of Group A touring car racing in 1985 at the Castrol 500 at Sandown Raceway in Melbourne, their VK Commodore suffering engine failure after just 41 laps. Brock retained Oxton for the 1985 James Hardie 1000 at Bathurst, but the pair again failed to finish. They ran strong all day, with then 8-time Bathurst 500/1000 winner Brock doing the bulk of the driving and Oxton only completing a 40 lap "lunch time" stint. Brock was second and only 30 seconds behind the leading TWR/JRA Jaguar XJ-S V12 of John Goss with three laps remaining. That was until the Holden V8 engine suffered a broken timing chain, the cars weak link in 1985. The timing chain broke on Conrod Straight, forcing Brock into the pits and into retirement.

Oxton went on to race in the 1986 Australian Touring Car Championship, finishing 17th in the series after competing in three of the ten rounds in an ex-Andy Rouse Ford Sierra XR4Ti. Oxton had earlier in the year shared the Sierra with Rouse at the Wellington 500. Rouse had put the car on pole position but Oxton didn't get to drive after the car suffered suspension failure in the early laps and was left opposite the pits for the remainder of the race.

With the Wellington 500 becoming a part of the 1987 World Touring Car Championship, Oxton re-joined the HDT, by now without factory support from Holden. He partnered Australian television commentator Neil Crompton in the team's second VL Commodore SS Group A, the car in which Brock, David Parsons and Peter McLeod had won Bathurst in a few weeks earlier.

Career results

Complete Bathurst 1000 results

Complete World Touring Car Championship results
(key) (Races in bold indicate pole position) (Races in italics indicate fastest lap)

† Not eligible for series points

References

1945 births
New Zealand racing drivers
Tasman Series drivers
Formula Ford drivers
Living people